Platynomyia is a genus of flies in the family Stratiomyidae.

Species
Platynomyia dimorpha Kertész, 1916	
Platynomyia edwardsi Lindner, 1939

References

Stratiomyidae
Brachycera genera
Taxa named by Kálmán Kertész
Diptera of Asia